Injection seeders are devices that direct the output of small "seed" lasers into the cavity of a much larger laser to stabilize the latter's output.  Most seed lasers are  stable, single-frequency lasers that emit within the linewidth of the larger laser's gain medium. The single frequency encourages the larger laser to lase in a single longitudinal mode, and the seed laser can also improve the laser's spatial profile and improve the M2 parameter. 
Seed lasers can be continuous or pulsed. Seeding a pulsed laser can reduce variations in the output energy and timing (jitter) from pulse to pulse, and smooth out temporal variations within the pulse. Many commercial lasers use a laser diode as a seeding source.

See also
Laser construction
Q-switching
Mode locking

References
Spotlight: Injection Seeding, Technical University of Darmstadt

Bibliography

Laser science